Brian Cladoosby (born May 13, 1959) is a Native American leader and activist. He served as chairman of the Swinomish Indian Tribal Community from 1997 to 2020 and was elected to his first of two terms as president of the National Congress of American Indians in October 2013. He previously served as president of the Affiliated Tribes of Northwest Indians. 

As president of NCAI, he introduced President Obama at a White House Tribal Nations Conference and was a guest at the state dinner given for the president of France.

Cladoosby is an active defender of tribal sovereignty, treaty rights and the environment. Cladoosby has been a staunch opponent of the Dakota Access Pipeline.

During his tenure as Swinomish chairman, the tribe became one of the largest employers in Skagit County, its police department was granted authority by the state to enforce state law, and health care was expanded to include dental care by dental health therapists, the equivalent of a physician assistant (PA-C). The tribe's didgwalic Wellness Center provides outpatient addiction treatment and is open to the general community. The Swinomish Tribe hosted the 2011 Canoe Journey.

Cladoosby lost his seat as Swinomish chairman on March 9, 2020, to Steve Edwards. Cladoosby had previously lost his reelection bid for the Swinomish Tribal Senate to Alana Quintasket in the February 9 general election.

References 

1959 births
Living people
20th-century Native Americans
21st-century Native Americans
Coast Salish people
Native American activists
Native American leaders
People from La Conner, Washington